Keith Cameron may refer to:

 Keith Cameron (rugby union) (born 1978), New Zealand rugby union player
 Keith Cameron (cricketer) (born 1947), Guyanese cricketer
 Keith Cameron (mining engineer) (1902–1967), Australian engineer after whom an Australian history chair at the University College Dublin is named
 Keith Cameron (soil scientist), New Zealand professor who won the Pickering Medal in 2021